The Fifth Amendment of the Constitution of South Africa made two technical changes, one relating to national election procedures and the other to the membership of the Financial and Fiscal Commission. It was enacted by the Parliament of South Africa, signed by Acting President Thabo Mbeki on 17 March 1999, and came into force two days later. It was signed and came into force simultaneously with the Fourth Amendment; the two amendments were separated because the Fourth involved provincial matters and had to be passed by the National Council of Provinces while the Fifth did not.

Provisions 
The Act made two technical modifications to the Constitution. The first was to clarify that, when the term of the National Assembly is due to expire, the President may issue the proclamation calling an election either before or after the term actually expires. The Fourth Amendment made the same change for elections to provincial legislatures. The second was to allow that the chairperson and deputy chairperson of the Financial and Fiscal Commission need not necessarily be permanent members of the commission.

Formal title
The official short title of the amendment is "Constitution Fifth Amendment Act of 1999". It was originally titled "Constitution of the Republic of South Africa Fifth Amendment Act, 1999" and numbered as Act No. 2 of 1999, but the Citation of Constitutional Laws Act, 2005 renamed it and abolished the practice of giving Act numbers to constitutional amendments.

External links

 Official text (PDF)

Amendments of the Constitution of South Africa
1999 in South African law